Rasim Kerimow  is a Turkmenistan football defender who played for Turkmenistan in the 2004 Asian Cup. He also played for FC Chita, Nisa Asgabat, Vorskla Poltava, Ahal Annau.

External links

1979 births
Living people
Turkmenistan footballers
People from Ahal Region
Footballers at the 2002 Asian Games
Association football defenders
Asian Games competitors for Turkmenistan
Turkmenistan international footballers
Turkmenistan expatriate footballers
Expatriate footballers in Russia
Expatriate footballers in Ukraine
Turkmenistan expatriate sportspeople in Russia
Turkmenistan expatriate sportspeople in Ukraine
FC Chita players
FC Vorskla Poltava players
FC Nisa Aşgabat players
FC Ahal players